Aspermont is a town in the U.S. state of Texas, and is the county seat of Stonewall County.
 The population was 835 at the 2019 census.

History
The town was established in 1889. Aspermont means "rough mountain" in Latin, and is probably a reference to the nearby Double Mountains. The city was founded by A. L. Rhomberg of Swiss-Austrian descent, who might have been a descendant of the  noble family Aspermont from Graubünden, which is known to have relocated to Dornbirn in the Austrian part of the Rhine Valley and changed the name to Rhomberg. Marshall Formby, later a Texas state senator, operated the Aspermont Star weekly newspaper in the middle 1930s. The paper is now known as the Double Mountain Chronicle .

Geography
According to the United States Census Bureau, the town has a total area of 2.1 square miles (5.4 km), all of it land.

Demographics

2020 census

As of the 2020 United States census, there were 789 people, 372 households, and 277 families residing in the town.

2000 census
At the 2000 census, 1,021 people, 418 households, and 282 families were living in the town. The population density was 493.2 people/sq mi (190.4/km). The  507 housing units averaged 244.9/sq mi (94.6/km).  The racial makeup of the town was 85.99% White, 4.31% African American, 0.10% Native American, 0.39% Asian, 7.25% from other races, and 1.96% from two or more races. Hispanics or Latinos of any race were 13.12%.

Of the 418 households, 27.5% had children under 18 living with them, 52.4% were married couples living together, 11.7% had a female householder with no husband present, and 32.3% were not families. About 30.1% of households were one person, and 15.6% were one person aged 65 or older. The average household size was 2.34, and the average family size was 2.90.

The age distribution was 23.4% under  18, 7.2% from 18 to 24, 23.4% from 25 to 44, 23.5% from 45 to 64, and 22.4% 65 or older. The median age was 41 years. For every 100 females, there were 82.6 males. For every 100 females age 18 and over, there were 81.0 males.

The median household income was $25,893.89 and the median family income  was $31,172. Males had a median income of $24,904 versus $13,971 for females. The per capita income for the town was $14,060. About 17.1% of families and 22.3% of the population were below the poverty line, including 37.5% of those under age 18 and 11.5% of those age 65 or over. Senior Citizens over the age of 85 have a median income of $7,937.07.

Education
The Town of Aspermont is served by the Aspermont Independent School District and home to the Aspermont High School Hornets.

Climate

References

External links
 Aspermont Star newspaper  hosted by the Portal to Texas History.

Towns in Stonewall County, Texas
Towns in Texas
County seats in Texas
Populated places established in 1889
1889 establishments in Texas